Panagiotis Spyrou may refer to:

 Panagiotis Spyrou (1936-2012), renowned cardiac surgeon, founder of the  thoracic surgery clinic at Papanicolaou Hospital in Thessaloniki in 1983, the first of its kind in Greece
 Panagiotis Spyrou, basketball player for Aris B.C.
 Panagiotis Spyrou, Greek weightlifter